Amrita Meghwal (born 19 November 1986) is MLA of Jalore. Who won from the Jalore Constituency as a BJP nominee is the First youngest candidate. She defeated Congress's Ramlal with a margin of 46,800 votes.

Notes

1986 births
Living people
Indian Hindus
People from Jalore district
Rajasthani politicians
Members of the Rajasthan Legislative Assembly
All Wikipedia articles written in Indian English
Women in Rajasthan politics
21st-century Indian women politicians
21st-century Indian politicians
Bharatiya Janata Party politicians from Rajasthan